Vernard Benton Hickey (November 11, 1900 – July 15, 1987) was an American football, baseball, and golf coach, college athletics administrator, and local politician. He served as the head football coach at the Northern Branch of the College of Agriculture—now known as the University of California, Davis (UC Davis)—from 1947 to 1948, compiling a record of 24–42–8. Hickey was the head baseball coach at the school, serving from 1938 to 1948 and tallying a mark of 49–87–1. He also coached golf at UC Davis. Hickey succeeded Crip Toomey unofficially as the athletic director at UC Davis following Toomey's death in the June 1961 and was officially appointed to the position in September 1963. Hickey also served as the mayor of Davis, California.

Head coaching record

College football

References

1900 births
1987 deaths
American football halfbacks
Mayors of places in California
People from Davis, California
UC Davis Aggies athletic directors
UC Davis Aggies baseball coaches
UC Davis Aggies football coaches
Washington State Cougars football players
College golf coaches in the United States
High school football coaches in California
Sportspeople from Everett, Washington
Players of American football from Washington (state)